Yaypuri (Aymara, also spelled Yaipuri) is a mountain in the Bolivian Andes, about 5,566 metres (18,261 ft) high. It lies in the Kimsa Cruz mountain range, southeast of  Kalsunani (Calzonani) and Quri Ch'uma. It is situated in the La Paz Department on the border of the Quime Municipality of the Inquisivi Province and the Malla Municipality of the Loayza Province.

See also
 Mama Uqllu
 List of mountains in the Andes

References 

Mountains of La Paz Department (Bolivia)